Women's Twenty20 International is a 20 overs-per-side cricket match played in a maximum of 150 minutes between any two of the ICC member sides. The first Twenty20 International match was held in August 2004 between England and New Zealand, six months before the first Twenty20 International match was played between two men's teams. The South Africa national women's cricket team played their first Twenty20 International match at the County Ground, Taunton in 2007, facing New Zealand, as the two teams' tours of England overlapped.

Since the team was formed, 58 women have represented South Africa in Twenty20 International cricket. This list includes all players who have played at least one Twenty20 International match and is initially arranged in the order of debut appearance. Where more than one player won their first cap in the same match, those players are initially listed alphabetically by last name at the time of debut.

Key

List of Players
Statistics are correct as of 26 February 2023.

List of captains

Notes

References

 
Women Twenty20 cricketers
Twenty20
South Africa